Kuenen is a Dutch surname. Notable people with the surname include:
 
 Abraham Kuenen (1828–1891), Dutch Protestant theologian
 Philip Henry Kuenen (1902–1976), Dutch geologist
 Gijs Kuenen (born 1940), Dutch microbiologist
 Johannes Petrus Kuenen (1866–1922), Dutch physicist